James Jamerson (1936–1983) was an American bass player.

James Jamerson may also refer to:

 James L. Jamerson (born 1941), United States Air Force General
 James Jamerson Jr. (1957–2016), American bass player, member of the band Chanson

See also
 James Jameson (disambiguation)
 James Jamieson (disambiguation)